Broughton is a village and civil parish in the City of Preston, Lancashire, England, approximately  north of Preston city centre. According to the 2001 census it had a population of 1,735, decreasing to 1,722 at the 2011 Census, increasing to 2,467 at the 2021. The parish is included in Preston Rural East ward of Preston city council, and the Preston Rural division of Lancashire County council.

The parish (officially Broughton-in-Amounderness) was part of Preston Rural District throughout its existence from 1894 to 1974. In 1974 the parish became part of the Borough of Preston, which became a city in 2002.

History
The manor of Broughton was originally part of the land owned by Earl Tostig and was later held by Uhtred, a Saxon thegn whose family took the name Singleton. In the reign of King John the manor was seized by Theobald Walter, but was restored to William Singleton by Henry III in 1261. It 1325 it was the home of Gilbert de Singleton. In the 16th century it was sold to the Langtons. The estate was gained, through marriage, by the Rawstornes in 1735. In the 1970s tithes were still being paid by the owner of Broughton Manor Farm to the church.

It was taken down in 1800 and Broughton Tower Farm was erected on the site. During the 1930s, when water works were being carried out, the moat was filled in.

Community

Schools
Broughton-in-Amounderness Church of England Primary School on Church Lane has approximately 290 pupils, aged 3 - 11. It was founded in 1590 and is one of the oldest extant primary schools in the United Kingdom. Church Cottage Museum is housed in the school's oldest building, which also dates from the late sixteenth century. 

Broughton High School on Woodplumpton Lane opened in 1975 and has approximately 900 pupils, aged 11–16.

The village has two nursery schools: Broughton Pre-School on King George V Playing Field, and Teddies Nursery, attached to the primary school.

Broughton & District Club
Situated on Whittingham Lane, the club offers flood-lit facilities for tennis and bowls. The stage in the main hall is used by for performances by the Broughton Players. The club hall also hosts parish council meetings.

Football
Broughton Amateurs AFC was formed in 1947 and plays in the Mid-Lancashire Football League. During their 'glory years' of the late 1970s through the 1980s they were managed by ex-Preston North End & Birmingham City striker Eddy Brown.

Churches

The parish Church of St John Baptist is the centre of a large Anglican community within the Diocese of Blackburn. It has two satellite worship centres and a parish hall in Fulwood. The church tower, which dates from 1533, is the oldest working building in Preston and is currently undergoing restoration. The nave was replaced in 1826, while the chancel was added in 1906. There is evidence of a church having been on the site in the twelfth century. The acclaimed Broughton Parish Church Choir of 20 men and 32 boy trebles is directed by John Catterall MBE and sings at two Sunday services.

The civil parish also contains the Roman Catholic St Mary's Church, Fernyhalgh.

Possible mosque
In 2022, it has been proposed that a mosque would be built at a site near the junction of the motorway in the parish. It would be situated at a high elevation and feature a Victorian mill-inspired  minaret which would make it one of the largest in Preston and would be visible on the skyline. However, the mosque plan has been met with opposition and support from both residents and local MPs. The plans are  being reviewed by the government.

Notable former residents
Graeme Garden, comedian
Dame Karen Pierce, British Ambassador to the USA
James Towers, recipient of the Victoria Cross

Telephone exchange
Broughton telephone exchange was the UK's first Crossbar exchange.  The current exchange building, which was extended at the front in the 1980s, was built for a field trial of Plessey's new 5005A crossbar exchange in 1964 replacing Broughton's manual exchange. The village was chosen due to its relative proximity to the Plessey factory and research centre at Edge Lane Liverpool.

Gallery

See also

Listed buildings in Broughton, Lancashire

References

External links

 
Villages in Lancashire
Geography of the City of Preston
Civil parishes in Lancashire